Aati Marttinen (born 26 December 1997) is a Finnish professional footballer who plays as a goalkeeper for TPS.

Career
Marttinen has played for ÅIFK and Inter Turku.

On 14 January 2022, he signed with TPS for the 2022 season.

References

1997 births
Living people
Finnish footballers
Åbo IFK players
FC Inter Turku players
Turun Palloseura footballers
Kakkonen players
Veikkausliiga players
Association football goalkeepers